Muhammad Kazim Khan (Urdu: محمد کاظم خان) was a Pakistani Politician and Member of Senate of Pakistan, currently serving as Chairperson- Senate Committee on Law and Justice.

Political career
He belongs to Punjab province of Pakistan, and was elected to the Senate of Pakistan in March 2009 on a reserved seat of Technocrats & Ulema as Pakistan Peoples Party candidate. He was the chairperson of Senate Committee on Law and Justice and member of senate committees of Functional Committee on Government Assurances, National Food Security and Research, Federal Education and Professional Training and Select Committee. He was elected Vice-Chairman Pakistan Bar Council in 2010.

See also
 List of Senators of Pakistan
 List of committees of the Senate of Pakistan

References

External links
Senate of Pakistan Official Website
Pakistan Peoples Party Official Website

Living people
Members of the Senate of Pakistan
Pakistan People's Party politicians
1947 births